Danny Pintauro (born January 6, 1976) is an American actor and film producer. He starred in the sitcom Who's the Boss? and the 1983 horror film Cujo.

Early life
Pintauro was born in Milltown, New Jersey, the son of John J. Pintauro, a manager, and Margaret L. (née Sillcocks). In 1994 he took time off from professional acting and attended Middlesex County College in Edison, New Jersey, and later Stanford University to study English and theater; he graduated in 1998.

Career
Pintauro first appeared on the television soap opera As the World Turns as the original Paul Ryan. After this, he played Tad in the film Cujo. He first came to prominence on the television series Who's the Boss?. After the series ended, he was less frequently cast. Pintauro went on to act in stage productions like The Velocity of Gary and Mommie Queerest.

He appeared as a contestant on a special TV child stars episode of The Weakest Link in 2001 where he got voted off in round 4.

Pintauro worked as a Tupperware sales representative and a restaurant manager in Las Vegas.

Pintauro and his husband relocated to Austin, Texas, in 2016. As of May 2019, Pintauro is working as a vet tech at Austin Pets Alive.

Personal life
In 1997, the National Enquirer tabloid outed him as gay. In April 2013 he was engaged to his boyfriend, Wil Tabares, and they married in April 2014.

Pintauro revealed in 2015 that he was HIV positive, having contracted the virus as the result of unsafe oral sex in 2003. He also disclosed that he had previously been addicted to methamphetamine.

Filmography

References

External links
 

1976 births
American people of Italian descent
American male child actors
American male soap opera actors
American male stage actors
American male television actors
American gay actors
Living people
Male actors from New Jersey
People from Milltown, New Jersey
Stanford University School of Humanities and Sciences alumni
20th-century American male actors
21st-century American male actors
LGBT people from New Jersey
People with HIV/AIDS
Middlesex County College alumni
21st-century LGBT people